Moneyball is a 2011 American sports drama film directed by Bennett Miller. The film features Brad Pitt in the lead role, who also co-produced it, with Jonah Hill, Philip Seymour Hoffman, and Chris Pratt playing supporting roles. Based on the 2003 nonfiction book of the same name by Michael Lewis, the film focuses on the 2002 season of the Oakland Athletics baseball team. The team's general manager Billy Beane (Pitt), and assistant general manager Peter Brand (Hill), decide to build the team by opting for a sabermetric approach to selecting players. The screenplay was written by Aaron Sorkin and Steven Zaillian, while Stan Chervin wrote the story.

Made on a budget of $50 million, Moneyball premiered at the 2011 Toronto International Film Festival on September 9, 2011, and had its theatrical release two weeks later on September 23, 2011. The film was successful at the box office, earning over $110 million. Rotten Tomatoes, a review aggregator, surveyed 254 reviews and judged 94% to be positive. The film was nominated for 73 awards, winning 19; its screenplay and the performances of Pitt and Hill received the most attention from award groups.

At the 84th Academy Awards, Moneyball received six nominations including Best Picture, Best Actor for Pitt, Best Supporting Actor for Hill, and Best Adapted Screenplay for Sorkin, Zaillian and Chervin, winning none. The film earned four nominations at the 69th Golden Globe Awards, and three nominations at the 65th British Academy Film Awards. Pitt, and Sorkin and Zaillian won the Best Actor and Best Screenplay respectively at the New York Film Critics Circle. At the 18th Screen Actors Guild Awards, both Pitt and Hill received nominations for their roles. The film earned four nominations at the 16th Satellite Awards – Best Film, Best Actor – Motion Picture, Best Supporting Actor – Motion Picture, and Best Adapted Screenplay. Both the American Film Institute and Dallas–Fort Worth Film Critics Association included Moneyball in their list of top ten films of 2011. The film was ranked sixth by the African-American Film Critics Association, and won Best Song for Kerris Dorsey's rendition of the song "The Show". The film's composer, Mychael Danna, won the Film Music Award at the BMI Awards. Miller won for Best Director at the 15th Hollywood Film Awards. Pitt as well as Sorkin and Zaillian were placed in the top ten of their respective categories, Best Actor and Best Screenplay, in the Village Voice Film Polls for 2011.

Awards and nominations

See also 
 2011 in film

Notes

References

External links 
 

Moneyball